Phyllanthus revaughanii is a species of flowering plant in the family Phyllanthaceae, native to the Mascarene Islands and the Mozambique Channel Islands (Europa Island, Juan de Nova Island). Its natural habitat is rocky shores.

References

revaughanii
Flora of the Mozambique Channel Islands
Flora of Réunion
Flora of Mauritius
Critically endangered plants
Taxonomy articles created by Polbot